Asadabad district is one of 15 districts in the Kunar Province of Afghanistan. It includes the city of Asadabad - the district center, close the Kunar River. It is situated in the central part of the province. It has 12 big and small villages, which are surrounded by mountains so there is not enough land for farming.

Borders
Before June 2004, Asadabad District bordered Dara-I-Pech District and Nuristan Province to the west, Bar Kunar, Dangam, Marawara and Sirkanay districts to the east and Narang wa Badil district to the south.

As of the 2004 Afghanistan administrative reorganization, Wata Pur District was spun off from Asadabad District, all of northeastern Asadabad District went to Dangam District and a small piece of eastern Narang District became western Asadabad District. The result was that Asadabad District borders on:
 Wata Pur District to the northwest,
 Dangam District to the northeast,
 Marawara District to the east and southeast,
 Sarkani District to the south, and
 Narang District to the west.

Demographics

The population of the district was reported in 2002 as 52,472, all of which are ethnic Pashtuns.

By the end of the Soviet–Afghan War in 1989, half of the houses in the district had been destroyed and nearly half of the population was living as refugees in Pakistan.

Water
The district has serious issues with flooding, which destroys large amounts of agricultural land.

Commerce
As of 2002, 75% of the population was landless, with 25% involved in agriculture, 20% laboring in the city, and the remained involved in either cutting lumber or expatriated to Pakistan and Iran for work.

Agriculture

Crops
Asadabad district produces wheat, rice, sugarcane and vegetable.

Livestock
Common livestock include goats, cows, sheep and buffalos, with oxen used for labor.

Human rights

De-mining
By 2002, all of the district except Sakai and Gira villages had been de-mined by MDC.

Localities
Asadabad
Shegai

References

External links
AIMS District Map
District profile

Districts of Kunar Province